The Lebanese Marine and Wildlife Museum  (al-matḥaf al-lubnani lil-hayat al-bahriya wa al-bariya) is a zoological museum in Jeita, and is one of the largest such museums in the middle east. Over 90% of the specimens in the museum were collected from Lebanon by Dr. Jamal Younes (president and owner of the museum).

Its main goals are to study Lebanon's ecosystem, encourage preservation, and maintain a scientific archive of Lebanon's wildlife and the Mediterranean marine life.

History 
The Museum was first opened in Tyre in 2001 by Dr. Jamal Younes, who has been collecting and preserving specimens for more than 30 years. After the collection grew too large, there was no more space for some  specimens, so it was decided to construct a new museum large enough to display all the specimens in Jeita.

Dr. Jamal Younes 
Born and raised in Tyre, a peninsula known for its rich history and ties to the sea, and distinguished for having both sandy and rocky beaches, creating a unique and rich marine ecosystem.

While studying Dentistry in Europe, he also learned taxidermy. After his graduation, he opening a clinic for orthodontics in Tyre, where he would  go out diving every night, most of the times on his own. Looking to find something new to add to  his collection and as time passed he amassed the biggest collection of taxidermy marine and wildlife in the Middle East, which was the basis of his Museum which today contains more than 5000  specimens.

Collections 
The Lebanese Marine and Wildlife Museum  has over 2000 species with over 5000 specimens on display. The museum currently contains 6 Exhibits which show off Lebanon's rich and diverse ecosystems, which are:

Mammals  
Displaying over 30 of Lebanon's mammals which once roamed freely the forests of Lebanon, most of which are now critically endangered, due to deforestation, indiscriminate hunting and habitat destruction.

Birds 
The Museum Has over 200 species of birds, both native and migratory

Reptiles 
over 20 species of lizards and 30 species of snakes collected from across Lebanon are on display

Minerals, Gems and Fossils 
over 300 specimens of minerals and gems from around the world

Seashells 
The seashell collections contains over 200 seashell species from the Mediterranean and over 300 of the largest seashells from around the world.

Marine life 
This huge display contains over 40 species sharks, one of them is a 7m basking shark, in additions to hundreds of fish, crabs, cephalopods, crustaceans, sea turtles, dolphins and a rare monk seal.

Location and facilities 
The museum is located in Jeita along Jieta Grotto road, 800m before Jeita Grotto.

References

External links 
 The Lebanese Marine and Wildlife Museum

Zoology museums
Natural history museums
Wildlife
Museums in Lebanon
Sharks
Rays
Ecosystems